RSU could stand for:

Universities
Rangsit University
Riga Stradiņš University
Rogers State University
Rostov State University
Romblon State University

Student unions
Radical Students Union, a frontal organization of the Communist Party of India (Maoist), a Naxalite group
Ryerson Students' Union, student organization at Ryerson University in Canada
Roehampton Students Union, student organization at the University of Roehampton in the UK

Other
Restricted stock unit, a form of stock award
Garda Regional Support Unit, of the Irish police
RSU, ICAO code for AeroSur (1992-2012), a defunct Bolivian airline 
RSU, IATA code for Yeosu Airport in South Korea